The Carlton Hotel is a luxury hotel located in Atascadero, California,  along the state's Central Coast in San Luis Obispo County. Construction began in 1928, with the hotel officially opening its doors in 1929. After several decades of local popularity and notoriety, by the early 1980s the property had fallen into deep disrepair. 
 
During this time, the dilapidation had degenerated into such extent that several local bands would play in the dark and abandoned lobby, and the gold-plated hands of the tower clock were stolen - sometime in the late 1970s. 

In 1999, a joint-venture, formed between David Weyrich, David Crabtree and Steve Landaker, purchased the hotel and embarked on a massive renovation project.  They successfully reopened the facility in 2004.  The hotel now boasts an artisanal Bakery & Cafe and has plans to open a restaurant in the future.

External links 
Official The Carlton Hotel website

Hotels in California
Atascadero, California
Buildings and structures in San Luis Obispo County, California
Buildings and structures in Atascadero, California
Companies based in San Luis Obispo County, California
Hotels established in 1929
Hotel buildings completed in 1929
1929 establishments in California
Tourist attractions in San Luis Obispo County, California